Ilan Sztulman was the Israeli Ambassador to Argentina from 2016 until 2019.  He replaced Dorit Shavit and was succeeded by Galit Ronen.

He served as Consul General to São Paulo.

Sztulman was born in Sao Paulo and made Aliyah when he was 18.

In early 2021 he began serving as the first consulate of Israel to the UAE in Dubai.

References

External links
Q&A with Ilan Sztulman, Israel’s Ambassador to Argentina, The Wilson Center

Ambassadors of Israel to Argentina
Israeli consuls
People from São Paulo
Brazilian emigrants to Israel
Year of birth missing (living people)
Living people